The Metcalfe Baronetcy, of Chilton in the County of Berkshire, was a title in the Baronetage of the United Kingdom. It was created on 21 December 1802 for Thomas Metcalfe, Member of Parliament for Abingdon between 1796 and 1807.

His second son, the third Baronet (who succeeded his elder brother), served as Acting Governor-General of India and as Governor General of the Province of Canada. In 1845 he was raised to the Peerage of the United Kingdom as Baron Metcalfe, of Fern Hill in the County of Berkshire. The barony became extinct on his death in 1846 while he was succeeded in the baronetcy by his younger brother, the fourth Baronet. He was also a colonial administrator. The title became extinct on the death of the eighth Baronet in 1979.

Metcalfe baronets, of Chilton (1802)
Sir Thomas Theophilus Metcalfe, 1st Baronet (1745–1813) 
Sir Theophilus John Metcalfe, 2nd Baronet (1783–1822) 
Sir Charles Theophilus Metcalfe, 3rd Baronet (1785–1846) (created Baron Metcalfe in 1845)

Barons Metcalfe (1845)
Charles Theophilus Metcalfe, 1st Baron Metcalfe (1785–1846)

Metcalfe baronets, of Chilton (1802; reverted)
Sir Thomas Theophilus Metcalfe, 4th Baronet (1795–1853) 
Sir Theophilus John Metcalfe, 5th Baronet (1828–1883)
Sir Charles Herbert Theophilus Metcalfe, 6th Baronet (1853–1928) 
Sir Theophilus John Massie Metcalfe, 7th Baronet (1866–1950) 
Sir Theophilus John Metcalfe, 8th Baronet (1916–1979)

References

Extinct baronetcies in the Baronetage of the United Kingdom